Jerzy Marr (21 March 1901 – 9 May 1962) was a Polish film actor. He appeared in 17 films between 1927 and 1942. His birthname was Oktawian Zawadzki.

Selected filmography
 Pan Tadeusz (1928)
 Pod banderą miłości (1929)
 Zabawka (1933)
 Wacuś (1935)
 Rapsodia Bałtyku (1935)

References

External links

1901 births
1962 deaths
Polish male film actors
Polish male stage actors
People from the Kingdom of Galicia and Lodomeria
Polish Austro-Hungarians
Actors from Lviv
Polish male silent film actors
20th-century Polish male actors